Nikos Tselios (born January 20, 1979) is a Greek-American former professional ice hockey defenseman. Tselios became the first draft pick in the history of the Carolina Hurricanes when he was selected 22nd overall in the 1997 NHL Entry Draft.

Playing career
As a youth, Tselios played in the 1993 Quebec International Pee-Wee Hockey Tournament with the Chicago Blackhawks minor ice hockey team.

Tselios was the first draft pick for the inaugural Carolina Hurricanes in the 1997 NHL Entry Draft. After he was drafted, Tselios returned to the OHL to play for the Belleville Bulls.

Tselios made his NHL debut with the Carolina Hurricanes during the 2001–02 season, playing two games. Those would be the only NHL games he would play as he spent the next four seasons playing in the minor leagues. In October 2005, Tselios signed with KalPa of the Finnish SM-liiga and played with them until January 31, 2006, when he moved to Färjestads BK of the Swedish Elitserien. He scored his first goal at Färjestad on March 25 in the semifinal of the Swedish Championship against HV 71.  He then played in the United Hockey League with the Chicago Hounds before returning to Sweden, signing with HK Örebro in the Swedish First Division, the country's third-tier level.

Personal life
Tselios is a cousin of long-time NHL defenseman Chris Chelios. Tselios also tried for the Greece national team in the 2006.

Tselios owns and operates an instructional hockey business called Infinity Hockey Selects, and resides in Illinois with his wife and son.

Career statistics

Regular season and playoffs

International

References

External links
 

1979 births
Living people
American men's ice hockey defensemen
American people of Greek descent
Belleville Bulls players
Carolina Hurricanes draft picks
Carolina Hurricanes players
Chicago Hounds (ice hockey team) players
Cincinnati Cyclones (IHL) players
Färjestad BK players
Ice hockey players from Illinois
KalPa players
Lowell Lock Monsters players
National Hockey League first-round draft picks
People from Glen Ellyn, Illinois
Plymouth Whalers players
Sportspeople from Oak Park, Illinois
Springfield Falcons players
Utah Grizzlies (AHL) players